Ethmia iranella is a moth in the family Depressariidae. It has been recorded from Asia Minor, Syria, Iran, Spain, Portugal, Hungary, Romania, Greece and southern Russia. It has recently been recorded from France and Italy.

The species was first described as a subspecies of Ethmia bipunctella, with type locality Elburs, Iran. It was later recognized as valid, separate species with a wider distribution.

The host-plant or host-plants of this species are not yet known, but Boraginaceae is likely.

References

Moths described in 1940
iranella
Moths of Europe
Insects of Turkey